Gustavo Nascimento Bastos (born 15 July 1983, in Pelotas), or simply Gustavo Bastos, is a Brazilian footballer who played as a centre back. After retiring in 2020, played in amateur and futsal teams until in 2022 started to be the manager of Pelotas's futsal club  Paulista Futebol Clube for sub-13 and sub-15

Career
After a good performance in the Campeonato Paulista with Mirassol, Gustavo Bastos was hired by Brasileiro Série A side Avaí in May 2011.

References

External links
 Avaí FC 
 

1983 births
Living people
Brazilian footballers
Sociedade Esportiva Recreativa e Cultural Brasil players
Esporte Clube Pelotas players
Associação Atlética Iguaçu players
Associação Atlética Flamengo players
Guaratinguetá Futebol players
Mirassol Futebol Clube players
Avaí FC players
Botafogo Futebol Clube (SP) players
Comercial Futebol Clube (Ribeirão Preto) players
Cuiabá Esporte Clube players
Guarani FC players
Vila Nova Futebol Clube players
ABC Futebol Clube players
Clube Atlético Tubarão players
Grêmio Esportivo Brasil players
Goianésia Esporte Clube players
Associação Atlética Anapolina players
São Gabriel Futebol Clube players
Campeonato Brasileiro Série A players
Campeonato Brasileiro Série B players
Campeonato Brasileiro Série C players
Campeonato Brasileiro Série D players
Association football defenders